August 28 - Eastern Orthodox liturgical calendar - August 30

All fixed commemorations below are observed on September 11 by Eastern Orthodox Churches on the Old Calendar.

For August 29, Orthodox Churches on the Old Calendar commemorate the Saints listed on August 16.

Saints

 The Beheading of the Glorious Prophet, Forerunner, and Baptist John (ca. 28)
 Saints Candida (418) and Gelasia (422), of Constantinople.
 Saint Theodora, nun, of Thessaloniki, who was from Aegina (892)  (see also: April 5)
 Saint Arcadius of Arsinoe, Cyprus, Bishop and Wonderworker.
 Saint Basil I the Macedonian, Byzantine Emperor (886)

Pre-Schism Western saints

 Saint Sabina, matron and martyr from Rome (c. 126)
 Saint Sabina of Troyes, by tradition the sister of St Sabinian of Troyes in France where she was venerated together with him (c. 275)
 Saint Candida, one of a group of martyrs who suffered on the Ostian Way outside the gates of Rome.
 Saint Euthymius, a Roman who fled to Perugia in Italy with his wife and his child, St Crescentius, during the persecution of Diocletian (4th century)
 Saint Adelphus, an early Bishop of Metz and Confessor (5th century)
 Saint Sæbbi of Essex (Sebbi, Sebba), King of Essex and monk (c. 694)
 Saint Medericus (Merry), a monk at St Martin's in Autun, where he eventually became abbot (c. 700)
 Saint Velleicus (Willeic), born in England, he followed St Swithbert to Germany and became Abbot of Kaiserswerth (8th century)
 Saint Eadwold of Cerne (Edwold), hermit at Cerne in Dorset in England (9th century)
 Saint Alberic, a monk who lived at Bagno de Romagua in Italy (1050)

Post-Schism Orthodox saints

 Venerable Alexander, Abbot of Voche, near Galich (16th century)
 New Martyr Anastasius (Spaso) of Strumica, at Thessaloniki (1794)

New martyrs and confessors

 New Hieromartyr Peter Reshetnikov, Priest of Perm (1918)
 New Hieromartyr Peter, Metropolitan of Krutitsa (1936)
 New Martyr Theodore Ivanov of Tobolsk (1937)

Other commemorations

 Commemoration of all Orthodox soldiers killed on the field of battle.
 Translation of the relics (1699) of St. Joseph Samakus the Sanctified, of Crete (1511)
 Repose of Hiero-Schemamonk Poemen of Cernica (1831)
 Repose of Righteous Pachomius the Silent, of Valdai Monastery (1886)

Icon gallery

Notes

References

Sources
 August 29 / September 11. Orthodox Calendar (PRAVOSLAVIE.RU).
 September 11 / August 29. Holy Trinity Russian Orthodox Church (A parish of the Patriarchate of Moscow).
 August 29. OCA - The Lives of the Saints.
 The Autonomous Orthodox Metropolia of Western Europe and the Americas (ROCOR). St. Hilarion Calendar of Saints for the year of our Lord 2004. St. Hilarion Press (Austin, TX). p. 64.
 The Twenty-Ninth Day of the Month of August. Orthodoxy in China.
 August 29. Latin Saints of the Orthodox Patriarchate of Rome.
 The Roman Martyrology. Transl. by the Archbishop of Baltimore. Last Edition, According to the Copy Printed at Rome in 1914. Revised Edition, with the Imprimatur of His Eminence Cardinal Gibbons. Baltimore: John Murphy Company, 1916. pp. 262.
 Rev. Richard Stanton. A Menology of England and Wales, or, Brief Memorials of the Ancient British and English Saints Arranged According to the Calendar, Together with the Martyrs of the 16th and 17th Centuries. London: Burns & Oates, 1892. pp. 424-426.

 Greek Sources
 Great Synaxaristes:  29 ΑΥΓΟΥΣΤΟΥ. ΜΕΓΑΣ ΣΥΝΑΞΑΡΙΣΤΗΣ.
  Συναξαριστής. 29 Αυγούστου. ECCLESIA.GR. (H ΕΚΚΛΗΣΙΑ ΤΗΣ ΕΛΛΑΔΟΣ).

 Russian Sources
  11 сентября (29 августа). Православная Энциклопедия под редакцией Патриарха Московского и всея Руси Кирилла (электронная версия). (Orthodox Encyclopedia - Pravenc.ru).

August in the Eastern Orthodox calendar